Visa requirements for East Timorese citizens are administrative entry restrictions by the authorities of other states placed on citizens of East Timor. As of 2 July 2019, East Timorese citizens had visa-free or visa on arrival access to 94 countries and territories, ranking the East Timorese passport 56th in terms of travel freedom according to the Henley Passport Index.

East Timor signed a mutual visa waiver agreement with the European Union on 26 May 2015.

Visa requirements map

Visa requirements

See also

 Visa policy of East Timor
 East Timorese passport
 Foreign relations of East Timor

References and Notes
References

Notes

East Timor
Foreign relations of East Timor